Babang Luksa is a 2011 Filipino independent suspense-horror-thriller film produced by Creative Minds Productions starring Precious Lara Quigaman, Luis Alandy and Angelika dela Cruz written and directed by Yuan Santiago.

Story
One year after the violent death of Beatrice, Anna (Precious Lara Quigaman) and her lover Carlos (Luis Alandy) starts experiencing supernatural events. Anna, who is a doctor who can see the spirits of the departed, thinks that Beatrice's ghost is haunting her. Anna talks to her friend Cathy (Roselle Nava) and give her an espiritista, Idang (Angelika dela Cruz), and the medium tells her that Beatrice, powered by her babang luksa, is possibly haunting Anna to exact her revenge, as Anna is the main cause of her suicide.

Anna performs a ritual to speak to the dead girl's spirit, and to pacify Beatrice's anger. For a while, the haunting stops... until the deaths begin. It begins with their common friend, Kris. More perplexed than before, Anna
consults Idang again, who tells her that it is not Beatrice's spirit that she called out – it is a Sigbin. A spirit trapped within the portal of the mirror, a Sigbin will need to acquire five spirits that are close to the person who set it free – Anna.

Five spirits who have no protection from Death by breaking the power of the pamahiin. The only way to save these five victims is to protect themselves from death by fulfilling the pamahiin. Despite Idang's invention, Tita Soledad is killed next.

Unable to take back what she did – knocked on Beatrice's casket – Kris's soul is taken by the Sigbin. Anna, Carlo, Idang and Miguel rushes to Beatrice' s grave. Miguel is taken by Sigbin. Idang is ultimately killed by the Sigbin for interfering with its will. Carlo digs up the body, and cuts the rosary. They are momentarily relieved...

The past flashes back and Anna realizes that before they bury Beatrice, Carlo discreetly placed a rosary in the corpse's pocket. Then Carlo is suddenly taken. Darkness swallows the scene, and Anna's scream is heard.

Cast

See also
List of ghost films
GMA Films

References

1. ^Babang Luksa  Manila Bulletin.November 16, 2011

External links

2011 films
Philippine horror thriller films
Philippine independent films
Filipino-language films
2010s Tagalog-language films
2011 horror films
Philippine supernatural horror films
2011 horror thriller films
2011 independent films
2010s English-language films